Camogantí is a corregimiento in Chepigana District, Darién Province, Panama with a population of 282 as of 2010. Its population as of 1990 was 205; its population as of 2000 was 329.

References

Corregimientos of Darién Province